Hugo Miguel Barreto Henriques Marques (born 15 January 1986) is an Angolan professional footballer who plays for Atlético Petróleos de Luanda as a goalkeeper.

Club career
Born in Fão, Esposende, Portugal to an Angolan mother and a Mozambican father, Marques played mainly lower league football in the country, joining FC Porto's youth system at the age of 16 and representing its reserves as a senior for three years. He appeared in six Segunda Liga matches for Gil Vicente F.C. in the 2007–08 season, conceding 12 goals.

In 2011, Marques moved to Angola where he appeared for Kabuscorp S.C.P. and C.D. Primeiro de Agosto. He was awarded Angolan nationality shortly after.

Marques returned to Portugal on 25 July 2016, signing a two-year contract with second-division club S.C. Covilhã following a period of trial. He left after only one year, however, joining S.C. Farense of the third tier.

Marques played all 24 games in the 2019–20 campaign (cut short due to the COVID-19 pandemic), as the side from Algarve returned to the Primeira Liga after a 18-year absence. He made his debut in the competition on 20 September 2020 when he came on as a second-half substitute for Rafael Defendi who had been sent off, in an eventual 2–0 away loss against Moreirense FC.

International career
Marques was selected to the Angola squad that was due to appear in the 2012 Africa Cup of Nations. He made no appearances in the tournament, in a group-stage elimination.

References

External links

1986 births
Living people
Portuguese people of Mozambican descent
Angolan people of Mozambican descent
Portuguese sportspeople of Angolan descent
Portuguese footballers
Angolan footballers
Association football goalkeepers
Primeira Liga players
Liga Portugal 2 players
Segunda Divisão players
FC Porto B players
C.F. União de Lamas players
AC Vila Meã players
Gil Vicente F.C. players
F.C. Tirsense players
S.C. Covilhã players
S.C. Farense players
Girabola players
Kabuscorp S.C.P. players
C.D. Primeiro de Agosto players
Atlético Petróleos de Luanda players
South African Premier Division players
Cape Town City F.C. (2016) players
Portugal youth international footballers
Angola international footballers
2012 Africa Cup of Nations players
Portuguese expatriate footballers
Angolan expatriate footballers
Expatriate soccer players in South Africa
Portuguese expatriate sportspeople in South Africa
Angolan expatriate sportspeople in South Africa
Angola A' international footballers
2022 African Nations Championship players